Studio Braun is a Hamburg, Germany comedy ensemble consisting of Rocko Schamoni, Heinz Strunk and Jacques Palminger.

External links
 Studio Braun

Culture in Hamburg